Robert Holmes Bell (born April 19, 1944) is an inactive Senior United States district judge of the United States District Court for the Western District of Michigan.

Education and career

Born in Lansing, Michigan, Bell received a Bachelor of Arts degree from Wheaton College in 1966. At Wheaton, Bell lettered in track each year. Bell received his Juris Doctor from Wayne State University Law School in 1969. He was an assistant county prosecuting attorney for Ingham County, Michigan from 1969 to 1973 and then became a judge, first on the Ingham District Court in Mason, Michigan from 1973 to 1979, and then on the Ingham County Circuit Court in Lansing from 1979 to 1987.

Federal judicial service

On March 11, 1987, Bell was nominated by President Ronald Reagan to a seat on the United States District Court for the Western District of Michigan vacated by Judge Wendell Alverson Miles. Bell was confirmed by the United States Senate on July 1, 1987, and received his commission the following day. He served as Chief Judge from 2001 to 2008. He assumed inactive senior status on January 31, 2017.

Chief Justice John Roberts appointed Bell to serve as chairman of the criminal law committee of the Judicial Conference of the United States. In that post, Bell wrote a letter to the Senate Judiciary Committee in 2013 opposing mandatory minimum sentences, saying they produce "unjust results" and waste public funds.

Personal life

Bell met his wife, Helen, while both were students at Wheaton. They have three children. Their son, Rob Bell, is the founding pastor of the Mars Hill Bible Church megachurch.

Notes

External links
 

1944 births
Living people
20th-century American judges
21st-century American judges
Judges of the United States District Court for the Western District of Michigan
Michigan state court judges
People from Lansing, Michigan
United States district court judges appointed by Ronald Reagan
Wayne State University alumni
Wheaton College (Illinois) alumni